Cégep de l'Outaouais (formerly known as Collège de l'Outaouais) is the biggest public college (CEGEP) in the Outaouais region. It is located in the city of Gatineau, Quebec, Canada. In 2002, about 75% of the region's high school graduates had been admitted to the institution. As of 2012 there are over 5,000 students attending the college.

Partnership
The College of General and Vocational Education is affiliated with the ACCC, and CCAA.

Campus
The Cégep provides teaching in French and consists of two separate, sister entities. The main campus, Gabrielle-Roy, is located on Boulevard de la Cité-des-Jeunes in the Hull sector. The second campus, Felix-Leclerc, is located in the Gatineau sector on Boulevard de la Gappe. There is also a third much smaller campus called Louis-Reboul located on Boulevard Sacré-Coeur in the downtown sector.

History 
The institution of what would become the CEGEP de l'Outaouais was founded in 1967 when the Quebec government under the Union Nationale with Daniel Johnson Sr. as premier, implemented a network of CEGEPs, a college educational level to replace classic courses that were abolished during the Quiet Revolution Era. During this time it incorporated several institutions that were previously under the jurisdiction of the Roman Catholic Church. It included the Institut de Technologie de Hull, the Collège classique Marguerite-D'Youville, for girls, the Collège classique Marie-Médiatrice, for boys, the École normale de Hull, the Institut familiale de Hull and finally the École des Infirmières de l'Hopital Sacré-Coeur. It was known until 1975 as the CEGEP de Hull, then as the CEGEP de l'Outaouais up until 1984, when it changed to Collège de l'Outaouais. In 2004, the name Cégep de l'Outaouais was restored.

Programs
The Province of Quebec awards a Diploma of Collegial Studies for two types of programs: two years of pre-university studies or three years of vocational (technical) studies. The pre-university programs, which take two years to complete, cover the subject matters which roughly correspond to the additional year of high school given elsewhere in Canada and one year of university with a focus on the student's chosen field. As a result, students who complete a Diploma of Collegial Studies usually only take 3 years to complete a bachelor's degree.  The technical programs, which take three-years to complete, applies to students who wish to pursue a skill trade. In addition Continuing education and services to business are provided.

The Cégep has several pre-university programs as well as technical programs. Among pre-university courses includes : humanities (three branches), natural sciences, "sciences, letters & arts" and "arts and letters". Technical programs includes, police techniques, computer sciences, multimedia, administration,  office automation, dental hygiene, health sciences, documentation, mechanical engineering, interior design, etc. Most technical courses are offered at the Gabrielle-Roy campus only, while most pre-university programs are offered at both Gabrielle-Roy and Felix-Leclerc.

While French is the main teaching language at the institution, there are also courses offered in English, Spanish, German and Mandarin. Most of them are given in the Arts and Letters program.

Sports
The Cégep de l'Outaouais' varsity teams are called the Griffons. The Cégep has teams in men's hockey D1, men's and women's volleyball, men's and women's basketball, men's and women's badminton, men's and women's soccer, and most recently football. The Gabrielle-Roy campus has several sporting facilities including two gymnasium, a swimming pool and a weightlifting room.

Extracurriculars

The student newspaper is named L'Entremetteur (roughly, The Intermediary).

Notable graduates 
Yves Ducharme
Pierre Lapointe

See also
List of colleges in Quebec
Higher education in Quebec

References

External links

Outaouais
Education in Gatineau
Educational institutions established in 1967
Buildings and structures in Gatineau
1967 establishments in Quebec